Hindaun Fort, in the area of Hindaun in Karauli District of the Indian state of Rajasthan.The Fort was built by Dagur clan of Jats who carved out a principality around Hindaun from the Mughal Empire.

References

Royal residences in India
Forts in Rajasthan
Hindaun Block
Tourist attractions in Hindaun
Sandstone buildings in India